Libertas Livorno was an Italian professional basketball team based in Livorno, Tuscany.

History
Established in 1947, the side played in the first division Serie A from 1959 to 1968 , in 1970-71 and again from 1981 to 1994 (with one season in the second division Serie A2.
Merging with another Livorno side, Pallacanestro Livorno under the Libertas name, the side went bankrupt in 1994.

Another Livorno side Basket Livorno represented the city in the Serie A afterwards before itself filing bankruptcy.
Libertas Liburnia Livorno, playing in the regional Serie C, is the symbolic heir to the side but was founded in 2004 with a new affiliation to the Italian federation.

Sponsorship names
Throughout the years, due to sponsorship, the club has been known as :

Libertas Livorno
Fargas Livorno (1966–68)
Peroni Livorno (1982–85)
Cortan Livorno (1985–86)
Boston Livorno (1986–87)
Enichem Livorno (1987–89)
Enimont Livorno (1989–90) 
Baker Livorno (1991–94)

Pallacanestro Livorno
Magnadyne Livorno (1980–81)
Rapident Livorno (1981–84)
O.T.C. Livorno (1984–85)
Allibert Livorno (1985–89)
Garessio 2000 Livorno (1989–90) 
Tombolini Livorno (1990–91)

Notable players 

Libertas Livorno
  Alessandro Fantozzi 10 seasons: '81-'91
  Flavio Carera 9 seasons: '83-'92
  Andrea Forti 9 seasons: '83-'92
  Alberto Tonut 7 seasons: '84-'91
  Jeff Cook 1 season: '86-'87
  Lee Johnson 1 season: '87-'88
  Scott May 1 season: '87-'88
  Joe Binion 3 seasons: '88-'91
  Wendell Alexis 2 seasons: '88-'90
  David Wood 1 season: '88-'89
  Anthony Jones 1 season: '90-'91
  Jay Vincent 1 season: '91-'92
  Elvis Rolle 1 season: '91-'92
  Maurizio Ragazzi 1 season: '91-'92
   Micheal Ray Richardson 2 seasons: '92-'94
  Žan Tabak 1 season: '92-'93
  Clifton Riley 1 season: '93-'94
  Gianmarco Pozzecco 1 season: '93-'94

Pallacanestro Livorno
  Claudio Bonaccorsi 8 seasons: '83-'91
  Elvis Rolle 5 seasons: '85-'88, '89-'91
  Rafael Addison 4 seasons: '87-'91
  Nino Pellacani 1 season: '87-'88
   Brad Wright 1 season: '88-'89
  Leonardo Sonaglia 1 season: '90-'91

References

External links
Libertas Livorno Serie A historical results  Retrieved 23 August 2015
Pallacanestro Livorno Serie A historical results  Retrieved 23 August 2015

1947 establishments in Italy
1994 disestablishments in Italy
Basketball teams established in 1947
Basketball teams in Tuscany
Defunct basketball teams in Italy
Sports clubs disestablished in 1994